Trevor Jeo Engelson (born October 23, 1976) is an American film producer and literary manager, whose work has included producing the TV series Snowfall, as well as the 2010 film Remember Me. Prior to his marriage to Tracey Kurland, he was married to Meghan Markle.

Early life and education 
Engelson was born on October 23, 1976, in Great Neck, New York, on Long Island. He is Jewish. He attended John L. Miller Great Neck North High School and studied journalism at the University of Southern California in Los Angeles.

Career 
After college, Engelson began a career as a production assistant and later moved into talent management before founding his own production company, Underground, in 2001. As a producer, he has worked on several films and television shows. These include Remember Me, Outpost 37, License to Wed and All About Steve. He also produced the series Snowfall. In 2018, Engelson was set to start work on a fictional drama for Fox Broadcasting about a British prince.

Personal life 
Engelson began dating Meghan Markle in 2004. The couple married at the Jamaica Inn in Ocho Rios, Jamaica on August 16, 2011. They separated after approximately 23 months and in February 2014 were granted a no-fault divorce citing irreconcilable differences. Engelson attracted significant media attention due to his previous marriage to Markle, when she became engaged to Prince Harry in November 2017.

Following his divorce from Markle, Engelson dated Bethenny Frankel of The Real Housewives of New York City. According to Frankel, their romantic relationship subsequently devolved into a business one. On June 1, 2018, Engelson became engaged to dietitian Tracey Kurland, daughter of investment trust founder Stanford Kurland (died January 2021), and heiress to a multi-million dollar fortune. The couple married on May 11, 2019, in California. In August 2020, it was reported that Kurland had given birth to a daughter. The couple had a second daughter in 2021.

Filmography

References

External links 

Living people
1976 births
Film producers from New York (state)
Film producers from California
American people of Russian-Jewish descent
USC Annenberg School for Communication and Journalism alumni
People from Great Neck, New York
20th-century American businesspeople
21st-century American businesspeople
Markle family